Euproctus, the European mountain salamanders, is a genus of salamanders in the family Salamandridae from Sardinia and Corsica.

Species
There are two species:

The Pyrenean brook salamander used to be included in this genus as Euproctus asper,  but was moved to Calotriton in 2005. Its superficial similarity with Euproctus likely represents convergent evolution: strongly depressed head and body, and reduction or even absence of lungs, are adaptations to fast-running, well-oxygenated mountain streams.

References

External links

Newts
Amphibians of Europe
Amphibian genera
Taxa named by Giuseppe Gené
Taxonomy articles created by Polbot